Delta Burke (born July 30, 1956) is an American actress, producer, and author. From 1986 to 1991, she starred as Suzanne Sugarbaker in the CBS sitcom Designing Women, for which she was nominated for two Emmy Awards for Outstanding Lead Actress in a Comedy Series.

Burke's other television credits include Filthy Rich (1982–83), Delta (1992–93), Women of the House (1995) and DAG (2000–01). She has produced and starred in made-for-TV movies, appeared in the film What Women Want (2000), and had a recurring guest role in the drama series Boston Legal (2006–07). She has also starred in the  Broadway productions of Thoroughly Modern Millie (2003) and Steel Magnolias (2005).

Early life and Miss Florida
Burke was born on July 30, 1956 in Orlando, Florida, to a single mother, Jean. Frederick Burke, an Orlando realtor, adopted her after marrying her mother. She has never met her biological father. Burke has two younger siblings: a brother, Jonathan; and a sister, Jennifer.

Burke graduated from Colonial High School in 1974, and won the senior superlative "Most Likely to Succeed." In 1972, she won the Miss Flame crown from the Orlando Fire Department and went on to become State Miss Flame. In her senior year of high school, she won the Miss Florida title for 1974; she was the youngest Miss Florida titleholder in pageant history.  Burke won a talent scholarship from the Miss America Organization, allowing her to attend a two-year study program at the London Academy of Music and Dramatic Art.

Career

Early career
In 1974, as part of winning Miss Florida, Burke appeared on the ABC-TV show Bozo the Clown, filmed in Orlando, Florida.

In 1980, Burke portrayed the role of the second Bonnie Sue Chisholm in the CBS western miniseries, The Chisholms. Burke spent a year on Filthy Rich in 1982 playing the wily young widow, Kathleen Beck. After that, she played female football team owner Diane Barrow on 1st & Ten from 1984 to 1986.

Designing Women
In 1986, Burke was cast as Suzanne Sugarbaker in the CBS sitcom Designing Women; she left 1st and Ten in order to appear on the show. Designing Women was created by Linda Bloodworth-Thomason, who had previously cast Burke in her show Filthy Rich. The show was set at an interior design firm in Atlanta headed by four women, and Burke was one of the show's four female leads. (Dixie Carter, another of the leads, had been the lead actress on Filthy Rich.) The show struggled in the ratings, and was even briefly cancelled after its first year, but in 1989 began to receive respectable ratings after being paired with the sitcom Murphy Brown. Burke became the show's breakout star, and earned two consecutive nominations for the Primetime Emmy Award for Outstanding Lead Actress in a Comedy Series in 1990 and 1991; she was the only lead female cast member of the show to be nominated. (Alice Ghostley received a nomination for Supporting Actress in a Comedy in 1992, for her recurring role as Bernice Clifton, while Meshach Taylor received one in 1989 for Supporting Actor in a Comedy Series.)

In 1990, Burke publicly expressed dissatisfaction with the show on a televised interview with Barbara Walters and other media outlets. She argued on Entertainment Tonight that there was a labor dispute, and actors were often forced to work over 15 hours per day, with executives even blocking the doors to keep actors on set. She also said that Dixie Carter, who had once been her close friend and maid of honor at her wedding to Gerald McRaney, was not speaking to her as Carter sided with her bosses. At the end of the fifth season of Designing Women in 1991, Burke was fired from the show due to her contentious relations with Carter and the Thomasons.

1990s
Burke was given her own vehicle with the sitcom Delta in 1992, in which she portrayed an aspiring country music singer. She dyed her hair blonde for the role. When ratings plummeted, Burke became a brunette again. The series was cancelled after one season. In 1995, she and Linda Bloodworth Thomason reconciled their differences, and Burke returned as Suzanne Sugarbaker in the Designing Women spinoff Women of the House (1995), but that show also met an early demise.

It took more than a decade for Burke and Carter to reconcile, but they did so when Burke guest-starred in an episode of Family Law, on which Carter was a regular cast member.

Weight issues
Since the early 1990s, Burke's weight has been a subject of discussion in the tabloid press. Her struggles with weight, depression, and eating disorders stretch back to her pageant days in the early 1970s. She became a much-parodied figure in the press due to the media's incessant obsession with her weight, including in a skit on Saturday Night Live, wherein Leon Phelps from The Ladies Man has a sexual fixation with her. In 1989, Burke asked Thomason to write an episode addressing her weight. The episode, "They Shoot Fat Women, Don't They?", had Suzanne Sugarbaker going to her 15-year high school reunion and having her feelings hurt after hearing disparaging remarks about her weight. Her performance on this episode is said to have led to her receiving her first Emmy nomination as Best Actress.

Later career
Burke has been a leading actress in a number of television films, and had a supporting role in the Mel Gibson film What Women Want (2000).

In the early 2000s, she co-starred with David Alan Grier on the sitcom DAG; she had lost much of her excess weight for the role after being diagnosed with diabetes.

Burke made her Broadway debut in September 2003, when she starred as Mrs. Meers in the musical Thoroughly Modern Millie. She was the third actress to play the role in the production, after Harriet Harris and Terry Burrell. She played the role until February 2004, before being succeeded by her Designing Women co-star Dixie Carter. Burke then played the role of Truvy in the original Broadway production of Steel Magnolias, playing the role for the shows entire four-month run from April 4 - July 31, 2005.

She also played Bella Horowitz during a five-episode arc on Boston Legal as a former flame of William Shatner's character, Denny Crane, in season three.

Burke appeared in a Hallmark Channel film, Bridal Fever, which aired February 2, 2008.

In March 2012, Burke was cast in the ABC comedy pilot Counter Culture. However, after Burke fell on the set, production of the pilot was suspended and it was not picked up to series.

Personal life
Burke has been married to actor Gerald McRaney since May 28, 1989. They have no children together, although McRaney has adult children from his prior marriages. Burke and McRaney's primary residence is in Los Angeles, California; they also own a house in Telluride, Colorado, and one in New Orleans, Louisiana.

Burke has been diagnosed with type-2 diabetes.

Burke is a supporter of gay rights, and has worked with openly gay playwright and screenwriter Del Shores on many occasions, in Sordid Lives and Southern Baptist Sissies. In 2006, Burke and openly gay Tennessean actor Leslie Jordan were uninvited from the Nashville talk show Talk of the Town after the show's managing director decided the subject matter to be discussed would offend the conservative viewers. Burke first became supportive of gay people and gay rights through attending acting school in London and also through her sister, Jennifer, who is a lesbian.

Burke is a designer and manager of the clothing company Delta Burke Design, headquartered in New York City.

Burke and McRaney are also the owners of an antique store in Collins, Mississippi.

Burke has compulsive hoarding syndrome, for which she received therapy. "At one time I had 27 storage units. I don't have a big enough house!" she said. "My mom had it, it's my mother's fault. She saved the diaper I came home from the hospital in!"

Filmography

Nonfiction
 Delta Style: Eve Wasn't a Size 6 and Neither Am I (1998, St. Martin's Press)

References

External links

 
 
 

20th-century American actresses
21st-century American actresses
Actresses from New Orleans
Actresses from Orlando, Florida
Colonial High School alumni
Alumni of the London Academy of Music and Dramatic Art
American adoptees
American film actresses
American television actresses
American LGBT rights activists
Living people
Miss America 1975 delegates
People with type 2 diabetes
1956 births